Under the Silver Lake is a 2018 American neo-noir black comedy written, produced and directed by David Robert Mitchell. Set in 2011 Los Angeles, it follows a young man (Andrew Garfield) investigating the sudden disappearance of his neighbor (Riley Keough), only to stumble upon an elusive and dangerous conspiracy.

The film premiered on May 15, 2018, at the 2018 Cannes Film Festival, where it competed for the Palme d'Or, before being released nationwide in France on August 8. It was theatrically released in the United States on April 19, 2019, by A24. Under the Silver Lake polarized critics; while its originality, direction, soundtrack, cinematography, and Garfield's performance were praised, some found the screenplay confusing, too cryptic, and lacking the substance and depth the film was aiming for.

Plot
Sam is an aimless 33-year-old in Silver Lake, Los Angeles, interested in conspiracy theories and hidden messages in popular culture, and uninterested in paying his overdue rent. Sam gets high and watches How to Marry a Millionaire with his mysterious new neighbor, Sarah. As they begin to kiss, Sarah's two roommates interrupt and Sarah suggests Sam come back the next day. Fireworks go off nearby as they stand outside Sarah’s apartment, and Sam comments that its be a bit late in the summer for them. For a moment Sarah seems transfixed, before giving him a breathless goodbye.

In the morning, Sam discovers Sarah and her roommates have moved out overnight, and becomes obsessed with learning what happened. Sam sees a news report detailing the discovery of billionaire Jefferson Sevence, burned to death in a car with three women. Sam recognizes Sarah's hat at the scene, and a small dog similar to hers, found dead.

Throughout his following journey, Sam meets several strange characters and experiences many bizarre events, all of which vaguely suggest that something sinister lies beyond the women's disappearances, and the city of Los Angeles itself. 

Eventually, Sam finds his way to an off-the-grid location where a man and three women live in a small hut. As Sam holds them at gunpoint, the man reveals the truth: throughout history, wealthy men such as himself chose to seal themselves in underground "tombs," much like Egyptian Pharaohs, in order for their souls to "ascend," accompanied by three wives, to an unexplained and unearthly domain. Sarah and her roommates were Sevence's wives, and their deaths were faked. Their tomb has already been sealed, but they can still be contacted via videotelephony. Sam speaks with Sarah, who confirms that she entered the tomb willingly. At peace with her fate, she and Sam share a brief farewell, and Sam drinks the tea that the wealthy man offered to him when Sam first arrived. The tea is drugged and Sam is taken prisoner by The Homeless King, who he was recently acquainted with on his journey. After learning that the wealthy man and his three brides have now also been taken to their individual tomb, Sam eventually convinces The Homeless King to let him go.

Returning home, Sam spends the night with a neighbor whose parrot repeats incomprehensible words. From the balcony, Sam watches as his landlord and a police officer enter his apartment to evict him. They notice one of his walls has been painted with a strange symbol, which Sam now knows to be a message from The Homeless King to "stay quiet".

Cast

Production

Casting and preproduction
In May 2016, David Robert Mitchell was announced to be writing and directing the film with Andrew Garfield and Dakota Johnson starring. Michael De Luca, Adele Romanski, Jake Weiner, and Chris Bender were also announced as producers. In October 2016, Riley Keough replaced Johnson and Topher Grace also joined the cast of the film. In November 2016, Zosia Mamet, Laura-Leigh, Jimmi Simpson, Patrick Fischler, Luke Baines, Callie Hernandez, Riki Lindhome and Don McManus joined the cast. Composer Disasterpeace, who provided the original score for Mitchell's previous film It Follows, returned to write the music.

Filming
Principal photography began on October 31, 2016. It took place throughout Los Angeles, including Silver Lake neighborhood, Silver Lake Reservoir, Griffith Observatory and The Last Bookstore.

Release
In May 2016, A24 acquired U.S distribution rights to the film. The film had its world premiere at the Cannes Film Festival on May 15, 2018. The first country it was released in nationwide was France on August 8, followed by Belgium on August 15.

The film was originally scheduled to be released in the United States on June 22, 2018, but on June 4 was pushed back to December 7, 2018. It was then pushed back again to April 19, 2019.

Reception
The website's critical consensus reads, "Under the Silver Lake hits its stride slightly more often than it stumbles, but it's hard not to admire—or be drawn in by—writer-director David Robert Mitchell's ambition." On Metacritic, the film has a weighted average score of 60 out of 100, based on 31 critics, indicating "mixed or average reviews".

Joshua Rothkopf of Time Out gave the film a perfect five rating, calling it "Hypnotic, spiraling and deliriously high" and stating "the ambition of Under the Silver Lake is worth cherishing. It will either evaporate into nothingness or cohere into something you'll want to hug for being so wonderfully weird." Eric Kohn of IndieWire gave a positive review, calling it "a bizarre and outrageous drama grounded in the consistency of Garfield's astonishment at every turn... It's fascinating to watch Mitchell grasp for a bigger picture with the wild ambition of his scruffy protagonist."

Owen Gleiberman of Variety gave a positive review, calling it "a down-the-rabbit-hole movie, at once gripping and baffling, fueled by erotic passion and dread but also by the code-fixated opacity of conspiracy theory. The movie is impeccably shot and staged, with an insanely lush soundtrack that's like Bernard Herrmann-meets-Angelo-Badalamenti-on-opioids." A.A. Dowd of The A.V. Club gave the film a B rating, stating "Mitchell is taking a big swing with his third feature, trying something not just new but also more unconventional, ambitious, and even potentially off-putting."

Emily Yoshida of Vulture stated about the film's message: "I kept coming back to the women in this extremely boy-driven movie—Mitchell suspects that they're all on one big conveyor belt to be chewed up and spit out by Hollywood, or if they're lucky, locked away in the dungeons of the rich and powerful. It's a rather pedestrian imagining for an otherwise admirably cuckoo film—you keep hoping for Mitchell to land on something weirder, more radical." Despite praising Garfield's performance and the film's originality, Bilge Ebiri of The Village Voice gave a negative review, stating: "If you're going to make a postmodern neo-noir sex-conspiracy... set in Los Angeles, it helps to have some personality, or at least a sense of style... Mitchell has interesting ideas, and his actors seem to be having fun, but that's not enough when the film itself lacks atmosphere, or tension, or emotional engagement."

In 2018, the film had positive reactions at the Neuchâtel International Fantastic Film Festival in Switzerland where it was awarded with the Denis-De-Rougemont Youth Award. At Sitges Film Festival Under the Silver Lake was awarded with the Special Mention of the Jose Luis Guarner Critics' Award.

Cult following 
While not initially a box-office success with audiences, Under the Silver Lake has garnered a cult following who are convinced that there are hidden meta-clues, codes and ciphers sprinkled throughout the film waiting to be discovered. These include references to the mystery surrounding the identity of the dog killer, various different cyphers or codes, geocoding systems, and even analysis of fireworks in the film, connecting the sound pattern they emit to Morse code. In certain scenes in the film there is graffiti that can be seen in the toilets and on a wall and which are coded with the Copiale cipher. The film's cryptography consultant was computer scientist Kevin Knight, who in 2011 co-created a program to translate the Copiale cipher.

References

External links
 
 
 
 
 
 

2018 films
2018 black comedy films
2018 independent films
American films with live action and animation
American thriller films
American neo-noir films
A24 (company) films
Cultural depictions of Kurt Cobain
Films about conspiracy theories
Films about cults
Films directed by David Robert Mitchell
Films produced by Michael De Luca
Films set in 2011
Films set in Los Angeles
American black comedy films
2018 thriller films
2010s English-language films
2010s American films
Films set in bunkers